HMS Brazen was a Clydebank three-funnel, 30-knot destroyer ordered by the Royal Navy under the 1895-1896 Naval Estimates.  She was the fifth ship to carry this name since it was introduced in 1781 for a 14-gun cutter, sold in 1799.

Construction and career
She was laid down as yard number 289 on 18 October 1895 at J & G Thompson shipyard in Clydebank and launched on 3 July 1896. During her builder's trials, she had problems attaining her contract speed. In 1899 during the construction of these ships, steelmaker John Brown and Company of Sheffield bought J&G Thomson's Clydebank yard for £923,255 3s 3d. She was completed and accepted by the Royal Navy in July 1900. After commissioning she was assigned to the Chatham Division of the Harwich Flotilla. She was deployed in Home waters for her entire service life.

On 30 August 1912 the Admiralty directed all destroyer classes were to be designated by alpha characters starting with the letter 'A'. After 30 September 1913, she was known as a C-class destroyer and had the letter 'C' painted on the hull below the bridge area and on either the fore or aft funnel.

World War I
In 1914 she was in active commission at the Nore based at Shearness tendered to HMS Actaeon, a Royal Navy training establishment.  With the outbreak of hostilities in August 1914 she was assigned to the Nore Local Flotilla.  Her duties included anti-submarine and counter-mining patrols in the Thames Estuary.

In 1919 she was paid off and laid-up in reserve awaiting disposal.  She was sold on 4 November 1919 to J.H. Lee for breaking.

Pennant Numbers

References
NOTE:  All tabular data under General Characteristics only from the listed Jane's Fighting Ships volume unless otherwise specified

Bibliography

External links
 "Arrowsmith" List: Royal Navy WW1 Destroyer Pendant Numbers

 

Ships built on the River Clyde
1896 ships
C-class destroyers (1913)
World War I destroyers of the United Kingdom